Karadla is a rural locality (a selo) in Shidibsky Selsoviet, Tlyaratinsky District, Republic of Dagestan, Russia. The population was 34 as of 2010.

Geography 
Karadla is located 17 km northwest of Tlyarata (the district's administrative centre) by road. Shidib is the nearest rural locality.

References 

Rural localities in Tlyaratinsky District